Modric may refer to:

 Modrić (surname), a Croatian surname with a list of notable people
 Luka Modrić (born 1985), Croatian footballer who plays for Real Madrid and captains the national team
 Modrič (disambiguation), toponym found in South Slavic countries

See also
 Modrica (disambiguation), toponym found in South Slavic countries
 Modřice (Modritz), a small town in Czech Republic
 Modriach, a small settlement and former municipality in Styria, Austria